The 1998–99 Sussex County Football League season was the 74th in the history of Sussex County Football League a football competition in England.

Division One

Division One featured 17 clubs which competed in the division last season, along with three new clubs, promoted from Division Two:
Broadbridge Heath
East Preston
Eastbourne United

League table

Division Two

Division Two featured 13 clubs which competed in the division last season, along with five new clubs.
Clubs relegated from Division One:
Arundel
Mile Oak
Peacehaven & Telscombe
Clubs promoted from Division Three:
Lingfield
Storrington

League table

Division Three

Division Three featured 13 clubs which competed in the division last season, along with three new clubs:
Bexhill Town, relegated from Division Two
Midhurst & Easebourne, relegated from Division Two
Wealden

League table

References

1998-99
1998–99 in English football leagues